Aiy (Sakha: Айыы, Ayıı) are benevolent spirits in Yakut mythology. They are creators of the world and of the fabulous land of the Yakut Olonkhos. In Sakha belief Urung Ai Toyon, creator of the world, is the greatest of them. According to mythology, the Aiy live in the Upper World. It is believed that the Aiy will not accept blood sacrifice and therefore they are presented "victims" of vegetable and dairy products.

Aiy symbols are required for the Ysyakh (spring feast) and regulated by the government of the Sakha Republic.

References

External links
 Christianity and Shamanism in the Sakha Republic (Yakutia)
 Shamans - Якутская мифология и шаманы, Алексеев Н. А.

See also
 Abasy

Turkic deities
Yakut mythology
Sakha Republic